The Kurdish calendar is a calendar used in the Kurdistan region of Iraq alongside the Islamic and Gregorian calendar.

History
The start of the calendar is marked by the Battle of Nineveh, a conquest of the Assyrians by the Medes in 612 BC.

Although the calendar is officially adopted in Iraqi Kurdistan its use is limited. Kurds in Iran use the calendar extensively as it is nearly identical to the Iranian Calendar. The calendar is not used by Kurds in Turkey and Syria as it is associated with Kurdish Nationalism and clashes with the official state calendars.

Details of the Kurdish calendar
The calendar is made to fit into society's constructions by being divided into two seasons (summer and winter). Months that fall into the summer season are 31 days long while months that fall into the winter season are 30 days long. The exception to this is the last month of winter which acts as a leap year and therefore will variate between 29 and 30 days.

Months
The names for the months are often derived from society's events in that month

References

Citations

Bibliography 
 
 
 
 
 
 
 

Kurdish culture